= Educational Research Network For West And Central Africa =

Educational Research Network For West And Central Africa, also known as Réseau Ouest et Centre African de Recherche en Education, is an educational organization found by United States Agency for International Development (USAID) in the year 1989 in Freetown the capital city of Sierra Leone. The organization came to being as a result of the efforts of a group of university academics and researchers who had benefited from the Research Training Program for Western Africa in 1974.

== Purpose ==
The primary aim of the organization is to bring together educationist and researchers within the West and Central sub regions of Africa to conduct researches geared toward improving educational practices and policies formulation in the sub- region.

The institution also ensures the production and dissemination of research findings conducted by institutions and researchers.

== Member countries ==
Benin, Burkina Faso, Cameroon, Central Africa Republic, Congo, Ghana, Gambia, Guinea, Guinea-Bissau, Mali, Mauritania, Nigeria, Senegal, Sierra Leone, Togo
